Margrit Thomet (19 June 1952 – July 1990) was a Swiss butterfly and freestyle swimmer. She competed in five events at the 1972 Summer Olympics.

References

External links
 

1952 births
1990 deaths
Swiss female butterfly swimmers
Swiss female freestyle swimmers
Olympic swimmers of Switzerland
Swimmers at the 1972 Summer Olympics
Place of birth missing
20th-century Swiss women